Polistes balder is a species of paper wasp in the Polistes genus from Australia to Christmas Island.

References

balder
Insects described in 1888